Rainy Wednesday Records was a record label created by novelty artist Dickie Goodman in 1973.

Creation
In his long career an artist and producer, Goodman released records under a slew of label names, including Luniverse (as Buchanan and Goodman in the late 50s), Rori, Mark-X, 20th Century and Cotique. In 1973, Goodman met the label's co-founder on a rainy Wednesday in New York, providing its name. Goodman started the label number at 201, the area code of his New Jersey residence at the time.

All but one of Rainy Wednesday's releases were in Goodman's standard "break-in" style, in which an interviewer asks a question, only to have it "answered" with a snippet of a current hit record. (The only non-"break in" recording released was a straight cover of Sheb Wooley's "The Purple People Eater", a #1 hit from 1958.) Goodman himself and John & Ernest (a black duo whose records consisted of soul-oriented snippets and the original funk tune "Crossover" on one the flip sides) were the only two artists to appear on Rainy Wednesday.

Discography

Later career
Dickie Goodman folded Rainy Wednesday Records in 1975, but continued to release music under several other label names, including Cash ("Mr. Jaws", a Top 5 hit in 1975), Shark, Wacko and Rhino Records. Goodman's last recording, "Safe Sex Report", was released on the Goodname label in 1987; he died in 1989.

References

Record labels established in 1973